Cerro Azul is a city in the  Mexican state of Veracruz.  Located in the state's Huasteca Baja region, it serves as the municipal seat for the surrounding municipality of the same name. 

In the 2005 INEGI Census, the city reported a total population of  
23,573.

History
The site had been a  area of rolling plains and hills used for cattle grazing (potreros).  Hundreds of little asphalt springs dotted the area where cattle bones could be seen caught in the black seepage.  Oil drilling in the area began in 1906.  

The town's population grew exponentially following the drilling of the Cerro Azul No. 4 well, at the time the world's largest pumping 260,000 barrels per day (BPD), in February 1916. The well was drilled by Herbert Wylie for the Mexican Petroleum Company, then controlled by California oilman Edward L. Doheny. Over the next 14-years the well would produce over 57 millions barrels. Doheny formed the Pan American Petroleum and Transport Company, of which the Mexican Petroleum Company portion would later become the PEMEX.  

The municipality of Cerro Azul was created on 27 November 1963, and the city was given city status on 6 December 1983.

References

External links 
  Municipal Official Site
  Municipal Official Information

Populated places in Veracruz